Jus inter gentes, is the body of treaties, U.N. conventions, and other international agreements.  Originally a Roman law concept, it later became a major part of public international law. The other major part is jus gentium,  the Law of Nations.  Jus inter gentes, literally, means "law between the peoples".

This is not the same as jus gentium, argues Francisco Martin and his co-authors in "International Human Rights and Humanitarian Law" (2006), because jus inter gentes includes internationally recognized human rights.

See also
 Human rights violations
 International law
 Jus gentium
 Law of nations
 United Nations

Notes 

Human rights
International law
Latin legal terminology